E22 may refer to:
 European route E22, a road extending from the United Kingdom to Russia
 GER Class E22, a British 0-6-0 steam tank locomotive class
 Etchells, a 22-foot sailboat
 Nimzo-Indian Defence, Encyclopaedia of Chess Openings code
 E22, a numbers station that was later discovered to simply be a repeated test broadcast run by All India Radio
 Senai–Desaru Expressway, route E22 in Malaysia